Macratriinae is a subfamily of antlike flower beetles in the family Anthicidae. There are at least 2 genera and more than 30 described species in Macratriinae.

Genera
These two genera belong to the subfamily Macratriinae:
 Macratria Newman, 1838
 Thambospasta Werner, 1974

References

Further reading

External links

 

Anthicidae
Articles created by Qbugbot